Cobb Creek is a stream in extreme northern Wright and south-central Laclede counties in the Ozarks of southern Missouri. It is a tributary of the Osage Fork Gasconade River. The stream origin is just southeast of Origanna and east of State Route TT. The stream flows NNE past Agnes, receives the waters of Blue Spring and flows just west of Drew. The stream joins the Osage Fork northwest of Drew.

Cobb Creek has the name of the local Cobb family.

See also
List of rivers of Missouri

References

Rivers of Laclede County, Missouri
Rivers of Wright County, Missouri
Rivers of Missouri
Tributaries of the Gasconade River